Bischweier is a municipality in the district of Rastatt in Baden-Württemberg in Germany.

References

Rastatt (district)